Macumba Love is a 1960 American adventure horror film directed and co-produced by Douglas Fowley and written by Norman Graham. The film stars Walter Reed, Ziva Rodann, William Wellman Jr., June Wilkinson and Ruth de Souza. The film centers on a writer who arrives on a South American island in order to finish his book on cult beliefs only to find that the local Voodoo Queen has other plans for him.

Plot

J. Peter Wells, an exposé writer, arrives on an island off the coast of South America, to complete a book on voodoo, ju-ju, macumba, mojo and other cult beliefs, which he believes are responsible for unsolved murders on this island. Wealthy landowner Venis de Vias warns him against stirring up the natives, especially any efforts to lessen the prestige of the reigning Voodoo Queen Mama Rata-loi. The arrival of Wells' daughter, Sara, and her husband, Warren, on a honeymoon trip, starts the pot boiling and making the natives restless, along with Queen Mama Rata-loi, who wants Warren and his friends (including Peter) to satisfy her own sexual appetite and blood lust.

Cast 
Walter Reed as J. Peter Weils
Ziva Rodann as Venus de Viasa
William Wellman Jr. as Warren
June Wilkinson as Sara
Ruth de Souza as Mama Rata-loi
Pedro Paulo Hatheyer as Insp. Escoberto
Cléa Simões as Symanthemum

Reception

On his website Fantastic Movie Musings and Ramblings, Dave Sindelar noted the film's lively score, effective voodoo sequences and shock moments, but criticized the film's acting as "uneven". TV Guide awarded the film one out of five stars, offering similar criticism towards the film's acting, calling the film "Fairly tedious".

References

External links 
 
 
 
 
 

1960 films
1960s adventure thriller films
1960 horror films
1960s horror thriller films
American adventure thriller films
American horror thriller films
Films about Voodoo
Films set on islands
Films shot in Brazil
United Artists films
1960s English-language films
1960s American films